Narciso Garay Díaz (June 12, 1876 – March 27, 1953) was a Panamanian violinist, composer, and political figure.

Born in Panama City, Garay was the son of painter ; his sister was the poet Nicole Garay. He studied at the Royal Conservatory of Brussels, where he took a first prize, and at the Schola Cantorum de Paris,
 and from 1902 until 1903 was a pupil of Gabriel Fauré. Returning to Panama, he became director of the new Escuela Nacional de Música, occupying the position from 1904 until 1918. Active as an ethnomusicologist, he published Tradiciones y cantares de Panama in 1930; his compositions include a sonata for violin. Active as well in the diplomatic service, at one time he served as Minister of Foreign Affairs. He died in the city of his birth.

References

1876 births
1953 deaths
Panamanian violinists
Panamanian composers
Panamanian male musicians
Ethnomusicologists
Male violinists
Male composers
Foreign Ministers of Panama
20th-century violinists
20th-century composers
Royal Conservatory of Brussels alumni
Schola Cantorum de Paris alumni
Pupils of Gabriel Fauré
19th-century male musicians
People from Panama City
Ambassadors of Panama to Colombia
Ambassadors of Panama to the United Kingdom
Ambassadors of Panama to the United States